Burkina Faso sent a delegation to compete at the 2008 Summer Paralympics in Beijing, People's Republic of China. According to official records, the country's only athlete competed in cycling.

Cycling

Men
Time trials & Road races

See also
Burkina Faso at the Paralympics
Burkina Faso at the 2008 Summer Olympics

External links
International Paralympic Committee

References

Nations at the 2008 Summer Paralympics
2008
Summer Paralympics